is an airport on an artificial island just off the coast of Kobe,  south of Sannomiya Station Japan. Opened on February 16, 2006, it primarily handles domestic flights, but can also accommodate international charter flights. In the first year of operation (2006), the airport handled 2,697,000 passengers with an average load factor of 61.1%. In 2017 it handled 3,071,974 passengers with an average load factor of 79.4%.

History
The city government of Kobe first proposed an airport adjacent to Port Island in 1971. The mayor of Kobe, Tatsuo Miyazaki, declared his opposition to building such a large airport so close to the city, and was re-elected shortly afterward in 1973, defeating a competitor who supported the airport.

Kobe businesses were still interested in the plan, however, and pressed the city government to propose a smaller facility with one  runway. This plan was submitted to the Transport Ministry in 1982 as a competitor for the Kansai International Airport plan which was then being supported by the Osaka and Wakayama prefectural governments. After the national government voiced its displeasure with the Kobe proposal, Kobe officially switched its support to the Kansai Airport proposal in 1984, but in 1985 decided to independently fund the construction of another airport.

The construction of the airport was stalled for lack of funding until 1995, when it won national government support as a means for recovering the Kobe economy in the wake of the great Hanshin earthquake. Despite ongoing controversy, locals continued to support the plan: in the 1997 mayoral election, the pro-airport coalition won a narrow victory over the anti-airport coalition. Construction began in September 1999 but political controversy continued: 87,000 signatures were collected in a petition to recall the mayor in 2000, and a citizen lawsuit to cancel the project was dismissed in 2004.

The airport finally opened on February 16, 2006, with Japan Airlines operating the first flight and All Nippon Airways operating the first scheduled flight. Both ANA and JAL announced plans to replace portions of their widebody fleet with a larger number of mid-size aircraft, in part because of a need to fill the excess number of flight slots created by Kobe Airport's construction. The airport handled its first international business jet flight in September 2006.

As part of its bankruptcy restructuring, JAL terminated all services out of Kobe and closed its office on June 1, 2010, in response to which Skymark Airlines announced a major expansion at the airport. ANA also cut back services following the airport's opening. Skymark is currently the dominant carrier at Kobe carrying approximately two-thirds of its passengers.

In 2013, Kobe mayor Tatsuo Yada endorsed a proposal to consolidate the management of the three Kansai region airports by adding Kobe Airport to the planned sale in 2014 of operating concessions at Itami and Kansai.

Kobe was already the most indebted municipality in Japan with debts of over ¥3 trillion after Great Hanshin earthquake, and this project's cost (estimated at over ¥300 billion, or US$3 billion) has made it very controversial. Supporters argue that the third airport can mean increased competition and lower airfares. People in the surrounding regions (Shikoku, Awaji Island etc.) can now have a closer airport while access to Kansai may be limited. Since the ferry from Tokushima to Kansai Airport was discontinued, travellers have had to rely on alternate means of transportation including a bus to Kansai Airport, which takes an hour longer, or to use the local Tokushima Airport, which is limited in schedules.

On April 1, 2018, Kansai Airports Kobe founded by Orix, Vinci Airport, and Kansai Airports took over the operation of Kobe Airport.

Airlines and destinations

Kobe has a single passenger terminal with four gates capable of accommodating widebody aircraft

Some international charter flights also use Kobe Airport. Although the airport's runway is not long enough to handle long-range flights to Europe and the Americas, it occasionally handles charters to China and other nearby countries.

The Transport Ministry has capped scheduled domestic operations at 30 daily flights, and has banned international flights with the exception of private aircraft and "own use" charters, in order to prevent overcrowding in the area's airspace and to protect the growth of Kansai Airport. The flight caps have been a point of controversy with Kobe Airport supporters, who point out that the cap was calculated based on Kansai Airport operating twice as many frequencies as are currently offered: given the current traffic levels at Kansai, Kobe should be able to handle six or seven flights per hour.

Statistics

Ground and water transportation

On February 2, 2006, Kobe Airport Station was connected to Sannomiya Station in central Kobe by an extension of the existing Port Liner automated guideway transit system, using 2000 series trains as well as some older 8000 series trains (older trains being gradually replaced by newer 2000 ones). Travel time to Sannomiya is 18 minutes. From Sannomiya, it is 21 minutes to Ōsaka Station and 51 minutes to Kyoto Station by JR special rapid express.

There are bus services to Shin-Kobe Station (on the San'yō Shinkansen), Sannomiya Station, and Kōbe Station in 25–38 minutes. A single trip to Shin-Kobe Station costs ¥330.

See also

Port of Kobe
Port Island
Hanshin Industrial Region

References

External links

  Japan Guide: Kobe Airport
  Kobe Airport Terminal
  Kobe Airport Terminal
  Kobe Airport Marine Air
 Kobe Airport Guide from Skymark Airlines
 
 

Airports in Japan
Artificial islands of Kobe
Artificial island airports
Transport in Kobe
Airports established in 2006
Buildings and structures in Kobe
2006 establishments in Japan